This list shows the IUCN Red List status of the 58 mammal species occurring in Albania. One of them is endangered, one is vulnerable, and four are near threatened.
The following tags are used to highlight each species' status as published by the International Union for Conservation of Nature:

Order: Rodentia (rodents) 

Rodents make up the largest order of mammals, with over 40 percent of mammalian species. They have two incisors in the upper and lower jaw which grow continually and must be kept short by gnawing.

Suborder: Sciurognathi
Family: Gliridae (dormice)
Subfamily: Leithiinae
Genus: Muscardinus
 Hazel dormouse, Muscardinus avellanarius LC
Family: Cricetidae
Subfamily: Arvicolinae
Genus: Arvicola
 Water vole, Arvicola terrestris LC
Genus: Clethrionomys
 Bank vole, Clethrionomys glareolus LC
Genus: Microtus
 Common vole, Microtus arvalis LC
 Felten's vole, Microtus felteni LC
 European pine vole, Microtus subterraneus LC
 Thomas's pine vole, Microtus thomasi LC
Family: Muridae (mice, rats, voles, gerbils, hamsters, etc.)
Subfamily: Murinae
Genus: Apodemus
 Yellow-necked mouse, Apodemus flavicollis LC
 Broad-toothed field mouse, Apodemus mystacinus LC
 Wood mouse, Apodemus sylvaticus LC

Order: Lagomorpha (lagomorphs) 

The lagomorphs comprise two families, Leporidae (hares and rabbits), and Ochotonidae (pikas). Though they can resemble rodents, and were classified as a superfamily in that order until the early 20th century, they have since been considered a separate order. They differ from rodents in a number of physical characteristics, such as having four incisors in the upper jaw rather than two.

Family: Leporidae (rabbits, hares)
Genus: Lepus
 European hare, L. europaeus 
Genus: Oryctolagus
 European rabbit, O. cuniculus  introduced

Order: Erinaceomorpha (hedgehogs and gymnures) 

The order Erinaceomorpha contains a single family, Erinaceidae, which comprise the hedgehogs and gymnures. The hedgehogs are easily recognised by their spines while gymnures look more like large rats.

Family: Erinaceidae (hedgehogs)
Subfamily: Erinaceinae
Genus: Erinaceus
 Southern white-breasted hedgehog, E. concolor

Order: Soricomorpha (shrews, moles, and solenodons) 

The "shrew-forms" are insectivorous mammals. The shrews and solenodons closely resemble mice while the moles are stout-bodied burrowers.
Family: Soricidae (shrews)
Subfamily: Crocidurinae
Genus: Crocidura
 Bicolored shrew, C. leucodon 
Lesser white-toothed shrew, C. suaveolens 
Genus: Suncus
 Etruscan shrew, Suncus etruscus LC
Subfamily: Soricinae
Tribe: Nectogalini
Genus: Neomys
 Southern water shrew, Neomys anomalus LC
 Eurasian water shrew, Neomys fodiens LC
Tribe: Soricini
Genus: Sorex
 Alpine shrew, Sorex alpinus LC
 Common shrew, Sorex araneus LC
 Eurasian pygmy shrew, Sorex minutus LC
Family: Talpidae (moles)
Subfamily: Talpinae
Tribe: Talpini
Genus: Talpa
 Mediterranean mole, Talpa caeca LC
 European mole, Talpa europaea LC
 Stankovic's mole, Talpa stankovici LC

Order: Chiroptera (bats) 

The bats' most distinguishing feature is that their forelimbs are developed as wings, making them the only mammals capable of flight. Bat species account for about 20% of all mammals. In Albania, 32 species were recorded.
Family: Vespertilionidae
Subfamily: Myotinae
Genus: Myotis
Alcathoe bat, M. alcathoe 
Brandt's bat, M. brandti 
Bechstein's bat, M. bechsteini 
Lesser mouse-eared bat, M. blythii 
Long-fingered bat, M. capaccinii 
Daubenton's bat, M. daubentonii  
Geoffroy's bat, M. emarginatus 
Greater mouse-eared bat, M. myotis 
Whiskered bat, M. mystacinus 
Natterer's bat, M. nattereri 
Subfamily: Vespertilioninae
Genus: Eptesicus
 Serotine bat, Eptesicus serotinus LC
Genus: Nyctalus
 Greater noctule bat, N. lasiopterus 
 Lesser noctule, N. leisleri 
 Common noctule, N. noctula 
Genus: Pipistrellus
 Nathusius' pipistrelle, P. nathusii 
 Kuhl's pipistrelle, Pipistrellus kuhlii LC
 Common pipistrelle, Pipistrellus pipistrellus LC
 Soprano pipistrelle, Pipistrellus pygmaeus
Genus: Hypsugo
 Savi's pipistrelle, H. savii 
Genus: Vespertilio
 Parti-coloured bat, Vespertilio murinus
Genus: Barbastella
 Western barbastelle, Barbastella barbastellus
Genus: Plecotus
 Alpine long-eared bat, P. macrobullaris 
 Grey long-eared bat, P. austriacus LC
Brown long-eared bat, P. auritus 
 Kolombatovic's long-eared bat, P. kolombatovici
Subfamily: Miniopterinae
Genus: Miniopterus
Common bent-wing bat, M. schreibersii 
Genus: Tadarida
 European free-tailed bat, Tadarida teniotis LC
Family: Rhinolophidae
Subfamily: Rhinolophinae
Genus: Rhinolophus
Blasius's horseshoe bat, R. blasii 
 Lesser horseshoe bat, Rhinolophus hipposideros LC
 Greater horseshoe bat, Rhinolophus ferrumequinum LC
 Mediterranean horseshoe bat, Rhinolophus euryale LC
 Mehely's horseshoe bat, Rhinolophus mehelyi LC

Order: Cetacea (whales) 

The order Cetacea includes whales, dolphins and porpoises. They are the mammals most fully adapted to aquatic life with a spindle-shaped nearly hairless body, protected by a thick layer of blubber, and forelimbs and tail modified to provide propulsion underwater.
Suborder: Mysticeti
Family: Balaenopteridae
Genus: Balaenoptera
 Fin whale, B. physalus 
Suborder: Odontoceti
Superfamily: Platanistoidea
Family: Delphinidae (marine dolphins)
Genus: Delphinus
 Short-beaked common dolphin, Delphinus delphis LC
Genus: Grampus
 Risso's dolphin, Grampus griseus DD
Genus: Orcinus
 Killer whale, Orcinus orca DD

Order: Carnivora (carnivorans) 

There are over 260 species of carnivorans, the majority of which feed primarily on meat. They have a characteristic skull shape and dentition.
Suborder: Feliformia
Family: Felidae (cats)
Subfamily: Felinae
Genus: Felis
 European wildcat, F. silvestris 
Genus: Lynx
 Eurasian lynx, L. lynx 
Suborder: Caniformia
Family: Canidae (dogs, foxes)
Genus: Canis
 Golden jackal, C. aureus 
European jackal, C. a. moreoticus
 Gray wolf, C. lupus 
Genus: Vulpes
 Red fox, V. vulpes 
Family: Ursidae (bears)
Genus: Ursus
 Brown bear, U. arctos 
Family: Mustelidae (mustelids)
Genus: Lutra
 European otter, L. lutra 
Genus: Martes
 Beech marten, M. foina 
European pine marten, M. martes 
Genus: Meles
 European badger, M. meles 
Genus: Mustela
Stoat, M. erminea 
Least weasel, M. nivalis 
European polecat, M. putorius 
Family: Phocidae (earless seals)
Genus: Monachus
 Mediterranean monk seal, M. monachus  possibly extirpated

Order: Artiodactyla (even-toed ungulates) 

The even-toed ungulates are ungulates whose weight is borne about equally by the third and fourth toes, rather than mostly or entirely by the third as in perissodactyls. There are about 220 artiodactyl species, including many that are of great economic importance to humans.

Family: Suidae (pigs)
Subfamily: Suinae
Genus: Sus
Wild boar, S. scrofa 
Family: Cervidae (deer)
Subfamily: Capreolinae
Genus: Capreolus
Roe deer, C. capreolus 
Subfamily: Cervinae
Genus: Dama
 European fallow deer, D. dama 
Family: Bovidae (cattle, antelope, sheep, goats)
Subfamily: Caprinae
Genus: Rupicapra
Chamois, R. rupicapra

See also
List of chordate orders
Lists of mammals by region
List of prehistoric mammals
Mammal classification
List of mammals described in the 2000s

References

External links

Théou, P. & Bego, F. 2018. Atlas of bats in Albania. 122pp.

Fauna of Albania
Albania
Mammals
Albania